Herbert Lovegrove Wright (13 April 1870 – 19 March 1950) was an Australian rules footballer who played for the Essendon Football Club around and during the years following the formation of the Victorian Football League (VFL).

Football
Wright made his debut in 1894, and was part of the Essendon team that won the premiership that year. He won his second premiership in the 1897 season. During that season, he kicked the winning goal for Essendon in the first round final against Geelong. He also played in the first ever VFL Grand Final the following year. A centreman, Wright finished on the losing team on that occasion but took part in a winning Grand Final in 1901, winning his third premiership.

At the end of the 1899 season, in the process of naming his own "champion player", the football correspondent for The Argus ("Old Boy"), selected a team of the best players of the 1899 VFL competition:Backs: Maurie Collins (Essendon), Bill Proudfoot (Collingwood), Peter Burns (Geelong); Halfbacks: Pat Hickey (Fitzroy), George Davidson (South Melbourne), Alf Wood (Melbourne); Centres: Fred Leach (Collingwood), Firth McCallum (Geelong), Harry Wright (Essendon); Wings: Charlie Pannam (Collingwood), Eddie Drohan (Fitzroy), Herb Howson (South Melbourne); Forwards: Bill Jackson (Essendon), Eddy James (Geelong), Charlie Colgan (South Melbourne); Ruck: Mick Pleass (South Melbourne), Frank Hailwood (Collingwood), Joe McShane (Geelong); Rovers: Dick Condon (Collingwood), Bill McSpeerin (Fitzroy), Teddy Rankin (Geelong).From those he considered to be the three best players — that is, Condon, Hickey, and Pleass — he selected Pat Hickey as his "champion player" of the season. ('Old Boy', "Football: A Review of the Season", (Monday, 18 September 1899), p.6).

Cricket
As a cricketer Wright was a wicket-keeper and one of the three first-class matches that he played was a Sheffield Shield encounter, against South Australia in the 1904/05 season. He finished his career with three catches and five stumpings to go with his 49 runs at 24.50.

See also
 List of Victoria first-class cricketers

References

External links

Cricinfo Profile: Harry Wright

1870 births
1950 deaths
Essendon Football Club players
Essendon Football Club Premiership players
Ballarat Imperial Football Club players
Australian rules footballers from Ballarat
Australian cricketers
Victoria cricketers
Two-time VFL/AFL Premiership players
Wicket-keepers